The 2016–17 Pro A season was the 95th season of the Pro A, the top basketball league in France organised by the Ligue Nationale de Basket (LNB). The season started on 24 September 2016 and ended on 24 June 2017.

A total of 330 games were played over the season, as Élan Chalon won its second national championship in club history after beating SIG Strasbourg in the playoff finals. D. J. Cooper of Élan Béarnais Pau-Lacq-Orthez was named Most Valuable Player of the regular season.

Teams

Promotion and relegation
Rouen Métropole Basket and STB Le Havre were relegated after finishing in the last two spots in the 2015–16 Pro A season. Hyères-Toulon Var Basket was promoted after it was crowned as the new Pro B champions. ESSM Le Portel was promoted from the Pro B after winning the promotion play-offs.

Locations and arenas

Notes
 Team makes its debut in the Pro A.
 The defending champions, winners of the 2015–16 Pro A season.

Regular season
In the regular season, teams play against each other home-and-away in a round-robin format. The eight first qualified teams will advance to the Playoffs, while the last two qualified teams will be relegated to the Pro B.

League table

Playoffs
The quarter-finals were played in a best-of-three format, while the semi-finals and finals were played in a best-of-five format. The higher seeded team would get home advantage during the series.

Final standings

All-Star Game

The event took place on 29 December 2016 and the game was played at the Bercy Arena in Paris. The Foreign Team won the game 129–130 and John Roberson of Élan Chalon was named All-Star Game MVP.

Awards

See also
 2016–17 French Basketball Cup

References

LNB Pro A seasons
French
LNB Pro A